NR Canis Majoris is a binary star system in the southern constellation of Canis Major, located to the east of Sirius and Gamma Canis Majoris near the constellation border with Puppis. It has a yellow-white hue and is dimly visible to the naked eye with a combined apparent visual magnitude that fluctuates around 5.60. It is located at a distance of approximately 297 light years from the Sun based on parallax. The system is drifting closer to the Sun with a radial velocity of −29 km/s, and in about three million years it is predicted to approach within . At that time, the star will become the brightest in the night sky, potentially reaching magnitude −0.88.

The magnitude 5.66 primary component is an F-type main-sequence star with a stellar classification of F2V. It is a Delta Scuti variable that varies by a few hundredths of a magnitude over roughly 16 hours. The star is an estimated 1.5 billion years old. It has a high rate of spin with a projected rotational velocity of 185 km/s, which is giving the star an equatorial bulge that is estimated to be 8% larger than the polar radius.

The secondary companion is magnitude 9.23 and lies at an angular separation of  along a position angle of 39°, as of 2005.

References

F-type main-sequence stars
Delta Scuti variables
Binary stars

Canis Major
Durchmusterung objects
058954
036186
2853
Canis Majoris, NR